Olney Arnold (September 8, 1861 - March 5, 1916) was the United States Ambassador to Egypt from 1913 to 1916.

Biography
He was born on September 8, 1861, in Cumberland, Rhode Island. He was appointed United States Ambassador to Egypt on September 2, 1913, and presented his credentials on March 23, 1914. He left the position on January 8, 1916.

He left Egypt aboard the SS Patria when it was attacked by a German submarine on March 1, 1916, off the coast of Tunis.

He died on March 5, 1916, in Lisbon, Portugal. He was buried in Swan Point Cemetery in Providence, Rhode Island.

References

External link

1861 births
1916 deaths
Ambassadors of the United States to Egypt
People from Cumberland, Rhode Island